Maikel Mesa Piñero (born 4 June 1991) is a Spanish professional footballer who plays as a midfielder for Albacete Balompié.

Club career
Born in Santa Cruz de Tenerife, Canary Islands, Mesa finished his youth career with hometown club CD Tenerife. He made his senior debut with neighbouring CD Laguna in the 2010–11 season, in Tercera División.

Mesa signed a two-year contract with CA Osasuna in July 2012, initially being assigned to the reserves in the Segunda División B. On 1 June 2013, he made his La Liga debut, coming on as a substitute for Francisco Silva in the 78th minute of a 4–2 away loss against Real Madrid.

On 30 January 2015, Mesa was loaned to third tier side Racing de Ferrol until June. After his loan expired, he was included in the main squad and began to appear more regularly. He scored his first goal as a professional on 24 January 2016, the last in a 3–0 home win over UE Llagostera.

On 21 June 2016, three days after achieving promotion to the top flight, Mesa was released and joined CD Mirandés on 13 July. On 29 June 2017, after suffering relegation, he agreed to a two-year deal at Gimnàstic de Tarragona also in the second division.

Mesa was transferred to UD Las Palmas in his native region on 17 August 2018, signing a four-year contract. On 11 January 2020, he was loaned to Albacete Balompié of the same league until the end of the campaign.  

On 25 July 2022, Mesa returned to Alba on a permanent one-year deal.

References

External links

1991 births
Living people
Spanish footballers
Footballers from Santa Cruz de Tenerife
Association football midfielders
La Liga players
Segunda División players
Segunda División B players
Tercera División players
CA Osasuna B players
CA Osasuna players
Racing de Ferrol footballers
CD Mirandés footballers
Gimnàstic de Tarragona footballers
UD Las Palmas players
Albacete Balompié players